The Judo competition at the 1971 Mediterranean Games was held in Izmir, Turkey on 14 October 1971.

Medal overview

Men

Medal table

References

 Mediterranean Games 1971 Results (PDF file)

External links
 

1971
Mediterranean Games
Mediterranean Games
Sports at the 1971 Mediterranean Games